Yueyang (575) is a Type 054A frigate of the People's Liberation Army Navy. She was commissioned on 3 May 2013.

Development and design 

The Type 054A carries HQ-16 medium-range air defence missiles and anti-submarine missiles in a vertical launching system (VLS) system. The HQ-16 has a range of up to 50 km, with superior range and engagement angles to the Type 054's HQ-7. The Type 054A's VLS uses a hot launch method; a shared common exhaust system is sited between the two rows of rectangular launching tubes.

The four AK-630 close-in weapon systems (CIWS) of the Type 054 were replaced with two Type 730 CIWS on the Type 054A. The autonomous Type 730 provides improved reaction time against close-in threats.

Construction and career 
Yueyang was laid down in June 2010 and launched on 10 May 2012 at the Hudong-Zhonghua Shipyard in Shanghai. Commissioned on 3 May 2013.

In mid-January 2014, the formation of Hengshui, Liuzhou, Yueyang and Sanya completed several offensive and defensive exercises in the training waters.

On June 9, 2014, Yueyang, Haikou and Qiandaohu participated in the RIMPAC 2014. The Chinese participating fleet set sail from the Sanya Military Port After crossing the Vietnam Sea and the Bashi Strait, sailing more than 2,100 nautical miles, arrived in the waters north of Guam on June 14. The ships of Singapore and Brunei joined together to form a multi-national task force to Hawaii. On June 24, a multi-national task force arrived at Pearl Harbor in Hawaii, the United States. During the period, Yueyang and others participated in a 38-day joint military exercise involving 22 navies and visited the United States. On September 3, after 87 days and nights, sailing 19,271 nautical miles, the Chinese navy fleet that participated in the RIMPAC 2014 and performed a visiting mission returned to a military port in Sanya.

On March 31, 2016, USS Chancellorsville was intercepted and monitored by the Yueyang near the waters of Huangyan Island in the South China Sea.

Gallery

References 

2012 ships
Ships built in China
Type 054 frigates